18 Ursae Majoris, or e Ursae Majoris, is a single star in the northern circumpolar constellation of Ursa Major. It is faintly visible to the naked eye with an apparent visual magnitude of 4.832. The annual parallax shift measured from Earth's orbit is 27.90 mas, which provides a distance estimate of 117 light years. It is moving closer to the Sun with a heliocentric radial velocity of −16 km/s, and is an unbound and older member of the Ursa Major Moving Group.

The stellar classification assigned to this star is A6 V, which indicates it is an A-type main-sequence star that is generating energy through hydrogen fusion at its core. The star's variability was first noticed by American astronomer Frank Schlesinger in 1914 and it has been given the variable star designation DD UMa. This is a low amplitude Delta Scuti variable with a magnitude change of around 0.4 and pulsation cycles of 9.4 and 15.0 cycles per day. It is rotating rapidly with a projected rotational velocity of about 158 km/s. This is giving the star an oblate shape with an equatorial bulge that is an estimated 6% larger than the polar radius.

18 UMA is about a billion years old with 1.72 times the mass of the Sun. It is radiating around 13 times the Sun's luminosity from its photosphere at an effective temperature of about 7,450 K.

Naming
With τ, h, υ, φ, θ and f, it composed the Arabic asterism Sarīr Banāt al-Na'sh, the Throne of the daughters of Na'sh, and Al-Haud, the Pond. According to the catalogue of stars in the Technical Memorandum 33-507 - A Reduced Star Catalog Containing 537 Named Stars, Al-Haud were the title for seven stars : f as Alhaud I, τ as Alhaud II, this star (e) as Alhaud III, h as Alhaud IV, θ as Alhaud V, υ as Alhaud VI and φ as Alhaud VII .

References

A-type main-sequence stars
Delta Scuti variables
Ursa Major (constellation)
Ursae Majoris, e
Durchmusterung objects
Ursae Majoris, 18
3541
079439
045493
3662
Ursae Majoris, DD
Alhaud III